Palomar 14 is a globular cluster located in the constellation Hercules. It is a member of the Palomar Globular Clusters group. Palomar 14 was discovered in 1958 by Sidney van den Bergh and Halton Arp during inspection of the photographic plates from the Palomar Sky Survey.
This is a round, diffuse cluster located in the outer
halo of the Milky Way galaxy. It is about 3–4 billion years younger than a typical galactic cluster.

The metallicity of the cluster is [Fe/H] = −1.50, indicating a lower abundance of elements with mass greater  that helium compared to the Sun. (This is the inner radius of the cluster that emits half the total luminosity.) These mass estimates provide lower bounds for determining the total mass of the cluster.

Because of the cluster's location on the outer fringes of the Milky Way, it was used as a test case for modified newtonian dynamics (MOND). This is an alternative hypothesis to explain the galactic rotation problem.

References

Globular clusters
Astronomical objects discovered in 1958